

Major events
1744—Vyborg Governorate was formed on the recently acquired parts of Finland; also included portions of St. Petersburg Governorate.
1744—Orenburg Governorate was created from the lands annexed from Siberian and Astrakhan Governorates.

Subdivisions (as of 1763)
Archangelgorod Governorate (Архангелогородская губерния)
subdivided into 4 provinces:
Archangelgorod Province (Архангелогородская провинция)
Galich Province (Галицкая провинция)
Ustyug Province (Устюжская провинция)
Vologda Province (Вологодская провинция)
Astrakhan Governorate (Астраханская губерния)
was considered subdivided into 1 province
Belgorod Governorate (Белгородская губерния)
subdivided into 3 provinces:
Belgorod Province (Белгородская провинция)
Oryol Province (Орловская провинция)
Sevsk Province (Севская провинция)
Kazan Governorate (Казанская губерния)
subdivided into 6 provinces:
Kazan Province (Казанская провинция)
Penza Province (Пензенская провинция)
Simbirsk Province (Симбирская провинция)
Solikamsk Province (Соликамская провинция)
Sviyazhsk Province (Свияжская провинция)
Vyatka Province (Вятская провинция)
Kiev Governorate (Киевская губерния)
was considered subdivided into 1 province (with 12 regiments in Little Russia)
Moscow Governorate (Московская губерния)
subdivided into 11 provinces:
Kaluga Province (Калужская провинция)
Kostroma Province (Костромская провинция)
Moscow Province (Московская провинция)
Pereyaslavl-Ryazan Province (Переяславль-Рязанская провинция)
Pereyaslavl-Zalessk Province (Переяславско-Залесская провинция)
Suzdal Province (Суздальская провинция)
Tula Province (Тульская провинция)
Uglich Province (Угличская провинция)
Vladimir Province (Владимирская провинция)
Yaroslavl Province (Ярославская провинция)
Yuryev Province (Юрьевская провинция)
Nizhny Novgorod Governorate (Нижегородская губерния)
subdivided into 3 provinces:
Alatyr Province (Алатырская провинция)
Arzamas Province (Арзамасская провинция)
Nizhny Novgorod Province (Нижегородская провинция)
Novgorod Governorate (Новгородская губерния)
subdivided into 5 provinces:
Belozersk Province (Белозерская провинция)
Novgorod Province (Новгородская провинция)
Pskov Province (Псковская провинция)
Tver Province (Тверская провинция)
Velikiye Luki Province (Великолуцкая провинция)
Orenburg Governorate (Оренбургская губерния)
subdivided into 4 provinces:
Iset Province (Исетская провинция)
Orenburg Province (Оренбургская провинция)
Stavropol Province (Ставропольская провинция)
Ufa Province (Уфимская провинция)
Revel Governorate (Ревельская губерния)
was considered subdivided into 1 province (Estland)
Riga Governorate (Рижская губерния)
was considered subdivided into 1 province
St. Petersburg Governorate (Санкт-Петербургская губерния)
was considered subdivided into 1 province
Siberian Governorate (Сибирская губерния)
subdivided into 3 provinces:
Irkutsk Province (Иркутская провинция)
Tobolsk Province (Тобольская провинция)
Yenisei Province (Енисейская провинция)
Smolensk Governorate (Смоленская губерния)
was considered subdivided into 1 province
Voronezh Governorate (Воронежская губерния)
subdivided into 5 provinces:
Bakhmut Province (Бахмутская провинция)
Shatsk Province (Шацкая провинция)
Tambov Province (Тамбовская провинция)
Voronezh Province (Воронежская провинция)
Yeletsk Province (Елецкая провинция)
Vyborg Governorate (Выборгская губерния)
subdivided into 3 uyezds

1744-1764
18th century in the Russian Empire